The Higher Education Relief Opportunities For Students (HEROES) Act was legislation passed unanimously by the United States Congress and signed into law by President George W. Bush on January 15, 2002. It was extended and amended in 2003, extended in 2005, and made permanent in 2007. 

The Act allows the U.S. Secretary of Education to grant waivers or relief to recipients of student financial aid programs under Title IV of the Higher Education Act of 1965, in connection with a war or other military operation or national emergency. It allows waiving of statutory or regulatory requirements related to federal student loans for three categories of individuals: active-duty military or National Guard officials, those who reside or are employed in a declared disaster area, or those who have suffered direct economic hardship as a result of wars, military operations, or national emergencies.

Extensions 
The statute originally set the expiry date for the waiver authority on September 30, 2003. In 2003, Congress extended the expiry date to September 30, 2005 and made several amendments. In 2005, Congress extended the expiry date to September 30, 2007. In 2007, Congress eliminated the expiry date, making the waiver authority permanent. In each case, the extensions were passed unanimously by both chambers of Congress, except for one dissenting vote in the House in 2003.

Use during the COVID-19 pandemic 
During the national emergency declared due to the COVID-19 pandemic in the United States, the HEROES Act has been invoked several times. In March 2020, the CARES Act passed by Congress included a pause on federal student loans repayments and interest until September 30, 2020. On August 8, 2020, the Trump administration issued a memorandum instructing the Secretary of Education to pause on student loan payments and interest through December 31, 2020 using the authority granted by the HEROES Act. On December 5, the administration extended the pause through January 31, 2021. During 2021−22, the newly inaugurated Biden administration extended the pause several more times, announcing that a final extension would last through December 31, 2022.

In October 2021, the Biden administration used the HEROES Act to reform a student debt forgiveness program for public workers. In August 2022, the administration used the Act again to announce student debt cancellation of up to $20,000 and several other reforms. This would later be the basis of Biden v. Nebraska.

References 

United States federal education legislation
Education policy in the United States
2003 in education
Acts of the 108th United States Congress